Anwesh Kumar Sahoo (born 4 July 1995) is an Indian artist, blogger, writer, model, actor and a TEDx speaker. He was crowned Mr. Gay World India 2016, becoming the youngest winner of the crown at the age of 20. He represented India at the Mr. Gay World 2016 pageant held in Malta, Europe and made it to the Top 12. He is a recipient of the Troy Perry Award for compassionate activism, making him the first Indian to be honored with the award. He's a graduate in Electronics and Communication Engineering from IIIT Delhi, and is currently a Master's in Design student at NIFT, New Delhi.

Early life and education 
Anwesh was born in Bhubaneswar, Odisha on 4 July 1995 to Jagannath Sahoo, an Engineer with NTPC, and Kanak Sahoo, a homemaker. Anwesh grew up in a small township of Kaniha in Odisha. At age 13, he and his parents moved to Noida, Uttar Pradesh. He completed his schooling at Vishwa Bharati Public School in Noida, and has mentioned of multiple instances of bullying throughout his school life in his interviews and blog posts.

In an interview with Gaylaxy Magazine, he said how he had a very good childhood until he started middle school and the bullying intensified. He said his only escape was his books and the dream of acing his 12th boards. He went on to score 95% in his Higher Secondary Exams. He also secured an All India Rank of 15 in the National Institute of Fashion Technology's exam in 2018, and is a student of M.Des at NIFT, New Delhi.

He came out as gay to his sister at the age of 16, and by the age of 18 had started writing a blog 'The Effeminare', to combat homophobia in his own little way and create awareness related to LGBTIQ issues in India. He went on to write an article called Under the Lucky Star for Pink-Pages, a National LGBT Magazine in India, where he came out to the readers and later on, also to his parents through the article. In his article he writes, "There is an underlying sense of security that only the walls of the closet can ensure. But then follows the phase of suffocation. The walls that once protected us begin to make us feel restricted. And what follows is the "end of self denial". This is when it all gets better." He went on to write another article the following year for Pink-Pages called 'Growing Up Gay', where he spoke of how contrary to the reactions of people, growing up gay in India isn't half as bad. He continued to write for online forums that same year.

Career 
Sahoo was a 3rd year engineering student at IIIT Delhi, when he was crowned Mr. Gay World India, and at 20 was the youngest contestant at the World pageant. His campaign Fitting Out gained widespread acclaim that year, garnering the highest marks at the World pageant. He was featured by Deutsche Welle, Germany's public international broadcaster where he spoke about coming out in a nation where indulging in homosexual acts could land you in jail.

Post winning Mr. Gay World India, he became a part of the 50 Shades of Gay campaign shot by Shubham Mehrotra and was featured on the Gay Star News that year. He became the first former contributor of Pink Pages to feature on the cover of the magazine in its June 2016 issue. Anwesh later gained mainstream visibility due to a video he shot with Gaysi called Silly Questions Straight People Ask Gay Men that went viral over the Internet and was subsequently featured on numerous Indian and International websites including BuzzFeed India, Cosmopolitan India, Vagabomb and Logo TV's NEWNOWNEXT. Another video featuring him belly dancing to a popular Bollywood number 'My Name is Lakhan' went viral later that year in December, with popular websites and news outlets featuring him including Indian Express, Storypick, Queerty and Vagabomb.

He also works as a writer for Swaddle, a parenting website where he writes on sexuality and gender related issues for parents. Some of his notable works on the site include, "What do you do if you think your child is Gay?", and "Gender and Sexuality Terms: A Sensitive Glossary for Parents". Anwesh has also written of his experience of being bullied online post winning the crown of Mr. Gay India, where he was criticized for not being 'pretty enough' and being 'too dark' to represent India on his blog The Effeminare, which was later published on Gaylaxy Magazine and covered by Pinksixty News. He also organized Delhi University's first pride walk in association with IIT Delhi's Annual fest Rendezvous to create awareness and promote acceptance for the LGBTIQ community. Anwesh has also been photographed by British photographer Olivia Arthur for a photo-series exploring sexuality in Mumbai, India which were later exhibited at the FOCUS Photography Festival, 2017 at Elysium Mansion, Colaba. Anwesh was named as one of the emerging LGBT Role Models of 2016 by Indian Women Blog, alongside transgender rights activist Laxmi Narayan Tripathi, and Business Analyst Himanshu Singh.

He was the ambassador for 'Dance4Pride' event organized by Delhi-based organization Those in Need in association with Scruff in April 2017. He has featured in a social media campaign for Delhi-based brand Poem bags. Anwesh has been a contributor for DNA, India with his article called "The Problem with Stereotypes" which was published on 23 May 2017. He shared his coming out story in the article writing, "The problem with stereotypes isn't that they're wrong, it's that they are incomplete." Sahoo made an appearance in National Geographic Channel's Explorer Season 10, Episode 12 (uncredited), that released on 22 May 2017. On October 6, 2018, Anwesh was awarded the Troy Perry Award for compassionate activism, in Los Angeles, California, making him the first Indian to be a recipient of this honor. He has been listed in Times India's list of 11 most inspiring LGBTIQA+ Indians with the likes of  Vikram Seth and Keshav Suri, and in 2020 was featured in Vogue India in the list of 5 queer Indian influencers you should be following on Instagram.

TEDx Experience 
Anwesh has spoken at 3 TEDx events: TEDxMAIS 2016 (Mallya Aditi International School, Bangalore), TEDxXIMB 2017 (Xavier's Institute of Management, Bhubaneswar), and TEDxCVS (College of Vocational Studies, Delhi University) . At the first event, Anwesh spoke of the need to break out of the Gender Binary. Through the talk, he challenged a world where sex and gender are often used interchangeably when in reality there exists a clear distinction between the two. He imagines a world where one's identity isn't limited to the binary male or female, but can manifest as a spectrum of infinite possibilities. His second TEDx talk, "Tapping into your Alice," related to growing up in a society that did not know how to deal with those who did not conform to gender stereotypes, in addition to how adulthood drains us of our belief in magic. Anwesh's third talk was called, "Growing up gay in India, and learning to be confident", where he spoke of how "Effeminacy and femininity aren't euphemisms for indignity; being gay, femme, brown, being me, is sexy and powerful!".

See also
 Mr Gay India
 Mr India World
 Rohit Khandelwal

References

1995 births
Living people
Indian gay artists
Artists from Bhubaneswar
Gay models
Male beauty pageant winners
21st-century Indian LGBT people